Air Vice-Marshal Richard John Martin Broadbridge, 5th Baron Broadbridge,  (born 20 January 1959), is a British physician, senior Royal Air Force officer, and hereditary peer. Having joined the RAF in 1981, he rose to serve as Director Healthcare Delivery and Training, Defence Medical Services from 2014 to 2018 and acting Surgeon General in 2017. He transferred to the Royal Air Force Reserve on 5 February 2018, and succeeded his father as Baron Broadbridge in 2020.

Honours
On 18 September 2009, Broadbridge was made Honorary Surgeon to The Queen (QHS). He was appointed a Companion of the Order of the Bath (CB) in the 2018 New Year Honours.

Arms

References

1959 births
Living people
Royal Air Force air marshals
Companions of the Order of the Bath
Royal Air Force Medical Service officers
Fellows of the Royal Aeronautical Society
Fellows of the Royal College of General Practitioners
20th-century Royal Air Force personnel
21st-century Royal Air Force personnel
Richard